Arundel Herald of Arms Extraordinary is a supernumerary Officer of Arms in England. Though a royal herald, Arundel is not a member of the College of Arms, and was originally a private herald in the household of Thomas Fitzalan, Earl of Arundel.  The first herald, John Cosoun, is known to have served the Earl both in Portugal in 1413 and later in France, where he attended his dying master in October 1415. The title was revived in 1727 as Herald Extraordinary.

A badge was assigned to Arundel in 1958, derived from a badge of the Fitzalan earls of the fourteenth century, and a supporter in the arms of the present Earl Marshal of England. It is blazoned A Horse courant Argent in its mouth a Sprig of Oak proper.

Holders of the office

See also
Officer of Arms
 Heraldry

References
Citations

Bibliography
 The College of Arms, Queen Victoria Street : being the sixteenth and final monograph of the London Survey Committee, Walter H. Godfrey, assisted by Sir Anthony Wagner, with a complete list of the officers of arms, prepared by H. Stanford London, (London, 1963)
 A History of the College of Arms &c'', Mark Noble, (London, 1804)

External links
The College of Arms
CUHGS Officer of Arms Index

English offices of arms
1727 establishments in England